Anastasia Sergeeva (born February 6, 1987) is a Russian sprint canoer who has competed since the late 2000s. At the 2010 ICF Canoe Sprint World Championships in Poznań, she won three medals with a silver (K-2 500 m) and two bronzes (K-1 4 x 200 m, K-2 1000 m).

References
Canoe'09.ca profile.

1987 births
Living people
Russian female canoeists
ICF Canoe Sprint World Championships medalists in kayak